Australasian Society for Continental Philosophy (ASCP) is a society dedicated to providing a broad intellectual forum for the scholars researching in continental philosophy.
The society was established in Melbourne in 1995. Richard Colledge is the chair and Joanne Faulkner is the deputy-chair of the society. The Society is the successor of the defunct Australian Association of Phenomenology and Social Philosophy (AAPSP)

Chairs
Robert Sinnerbrink (2007-2010)
Marguerite La Caze (2010-2013)
Jo Faulkner (2013-2016)
Simone Bignall (2016-2018)
Richard Colledge (2018-)

References

External links
 ASCP - ASCP website

Philosophy education
Philosophical societies in Australia
Organizations established in 1995
1995 establishments in Australia
Continental philosophy organizations